Giovanni Simeoni (July 12, 1816 – January 14, 1892) was an Italian Cardinal of the Roman Catholic Church who served as Prefect of the Sacred Congregation for Propagation of the Faith from 1878 until his death, and was elevated to the cardinalate in 1875.

Biography
Giovanni Simeoni was born in Paliano; his father was a majordomo of the Colonna family. He attended the seminary in Palestrina before going to Rome to study at the Collegio Romano and La Sapienza University, where he studied theology and canon law. The Colonna family subsidized his studies.

Simeoni was ordained to the priesthood in 1839. He then served as preceptor of the children of Prince Colonna, and as professor of philosophy and theology at the Pontifical Urban Athenaeum of Propaganda Fide. After being raised to the rank of Privy Chamberlain of His Holiness, he was made auditor of the nunciature to Spain and Domestic Prelate of His Holiness (1857). Simeoni later became adiutor ab actis of the Sacred Congregation for the Propagation of the Faith, and served as the Congregation's secretary from 1868 to 1875.

On March 5, 1875, Simeoni was appointed Nuncio to Spain and Titular Archbishop of Chalcedon by Pope Gregory XVI. Pope Gregory also secretly (in pectore) elevated him to the College of Cardinals in the consistory of March 15 of that same year. Simeoni received his episcopal consecration on the following April 4 from Cardinal Alessandro Franchi, with Archbishops Edward Henry Howard and Pietro Villanova Castellacci serving as co-consecrators, in the chapel of the Pontifical Urban Athenaeum of Propaganda Fide.

Simeoni was published as Cardinal Priest of San Pietro in Vincoli in the consistory of September 17, 1875. Between December 18, 1876 and the death of Pope Pius IX on February 7, 1878, he also served as Vatican Secretary of State, Prefect of the Sacred Congregation of Public Ecclesiastical Affairs, Prefect of the Apostolic Palace, and Administrator of the Patrimony of the Holy See; Pius IX had designated him as executor of his will as well.

The Cardinal then participated in the conclave of 1878, which resulted in the election of Pope Leo XIII, who confirmed him as Prefect of the Apostolic Palace and Administrator of the Patrimony of the Holy See. From 1878 until his death, he served as Protector of the Pontifical North American College in Rome. Simeoni was named Prefect of the Sacred Congregation for the Propagation of the Faith, also known as the "Red Pope", on March 5, 1878, and president of the missionary seminaries of Rome on January 1, 1885. From March 27, 1885 to January 15, 1886, he served as Camerlengo of the Sacred College of Cardinals.

Cardinal Simeoni died in Rome, at the age of 75. After lying in state in the church of the Pontifical Urban Athenaeum of Propaganda Fide, he was buried in the chapel of the same athenaeum in the Campo Verano cemetery. Simeoni also left his notable art collection to the Pope in his will.

Episcopal lineage

Simeoni's episcopal lineage, or apostolic succession was:

 Cardinal Scipione Rebiba
 Cardinal Giulio Antonio Santorio
 Cardinal Girolamo Bernerio
 Archbishop Galeazzo Sanvitale
 Cardinal Ludovico Ludovisi
 Cardinal Luigi Caetani
 Cardinal Ulderico Carpegna
 Cardinal Paluzzo Paluzzi Altieri degli Albertoni
 Pope Benedict XIII
 Pope Benedict XIV
 Cardinal Enrico Enríquez
 Archbishop Manuel Quintano Bonifaz
 Cardinal Buenaventura Fernández de Córdoba Spínola
 Cardinal Giuseppe Doria Pamphili
 Pope Pius VIII
 Pope Pius IX
 Cardinal Alessandro Franchi
 Cardinal Giovanni Simeoni

References

External links
Catholic-Hierarchy
Cardinals of the Holy Roman Church

1816 births
1892 deaths
People from the Province of Frosinone
19th-century Italian cardinals
Cardinals created by Pope Pius IX
19th-century Italian Roman Catholic archbishops
Diplomats of the Holy See
Cardinal Secretaries of State
Members of the Congregation for the Propagation of the Faith